Galkin is a rural locality (a khutor) in Slashchyovskoye Rural Settlement, Kumylzhensky District, Volgograd Oblast, Russia. The population was 91 as of 2010. There are 2 streets.

Geography 
Galkin is located in forest steppe, on Khopyorsko-Buzulukskaya Plain, on the bank of the Malaya Rasteryayevka River, 30 km southwest of Kumylzhenskaya (the district's administrative centre) by road. Devkin is the nearest rural locality.

References 

Rural localities in Kumylzhensky District